The 2009 Wyoming Cowboys football team represented the University of Wyoming in the 2009 NCAA Division I FBS college football season. The Cowboys were led by first-year head coach Dave Christensen and played their home games at War Memorial Stadium. The Cowboys finished the season 7–6, 4–4 in Mountain West play and won the New Mexico Bowl, 35–28, in two overtimes against Fresno State.

Schedule

References

Wyoming
Wyoming Cowboys football seasons
New Mexico Bowl champion seasons
Wyoming Cowboys football